Miss Greenland is a national beauty pageant in Greenland.

History 
For the years 1987 through 1990, Miss Greenland participated in the Miss Universe pageant. For 1991 and 1992, Miss Greenland participated in the Miss World pageant. It was announced in 2015, that Miss Greenland would be revived in 2016.

Titleholders 
Color key

References 

Greenland
Recurring events established in 1991
World
Greenlandic awards